Israel Fabian Byrd (born February 1, 1971) is a former professional American football cornerback who played in the National Football League (NFL), NFL Europe, and the Arena Football League (AFL).

Early years
At Parkway Central High School, Byrd excelled in football, basketball, and track and field. During his college career, he continued to excel in football and track and field at Allan Hancock College in Santa Maria, California and Utah State University in Logan, Utah.  Byrd received All-Conference and All-State honors in both football and track and field during high school and All-Conference honors in both sports during his college years.

Professional football career
In the NFL, Byrd played for the New Orleans Saints (1994–1996) and the Tennessee Titans (1999) and was allocated to the Scottish Claymores (1995 and 1997) and Berlin Thunder (1999) in the NFL Europe league.  He returned to the United States from NFL Europe as a member of the Tennessee Titans roster, where he joined his younger brother - wide receiver Isaac Byrd.

Upon recovering from injuries, Byrd continued to play American football as a defensive specialist in the Arena Football League with the Tampa Bay Storm (2000) and the Detroit Fury (2001).  After retiring from professional football, Byrd decided to complete his bachelor's degree in business and interdisciplinary studies at Utah State University and later developed and implemented business ventures.

Coaching career
In 2000, Byrd began his transition into coaching defensive backs on the collegiate level.  In 2008, Byrd was selected to coach Defensive Backs with the St. Louis Rams as a part of the Bill Walsh NFL Minority Coaching Fellowship Program, which provides NFL Training Camp positions to minority coaches every year.  Many current NFL coaches have participated in the program and some past graduates of the program have gone on to be appointed to NFL coordinator or head coaching positions.  In 2009, he was re-selected to participate in the Bill Walsh NFL Minority Coaching Fellowship Program to coach Defensive Backs with the Washington Redskins.

Byrd has been coaching Defensive Backs on the collegiate level for over five years and completed his fourth year as a Defensive Backs Coach for Washington University in St. Louis NCAA DIII football program in 2011. Byrd's defensive secondary strategies and tactics have gained him notoriety allowing him to speak at the Nike Coach of the Year Clinic in St. Louis in 2008 and 2009, where he was a Clinic Speaker on man-to-man and bump and run teaching progressions. As a result, several defensive back players at Washington University in St. Louis earned All-Conference, All-Regional, and All-American honors.

In 2011, Byrd was selected to participate in the Bill Walsh NFL Minority Coaching Fellowship Program to coach Defensive Backs and Special Teams with the Dallas Cowboys.

References
Just Sports Stats
Israel Byrd NFL Player Profile
Brown, Rick, "Storm Defeat Kats, 40-30",  The Ledger, June 18, 2000
Eisenbath, Mike, "No Fantasy; Hard Work Making Dreams Come True for Isaac Byrd",  St. Louis Post-Dispatch, November 26, 1992.
Israel Byrd Player Profile. ArmchairGM
Israel Byrd Player News.  ArenaFan Online
Kuharsky, Paul, "Five Titans to NFL Europe", The Tennessean, February 23, 1999
"Transactions", The New York Times, May 9, 1993
"Transactions", The New York Times, August 20, 1996.
Nike Coach of the Year Football Clinic, St. Louis, Missouri
Thomas, Jim, "A Cut Above; 3 Area Players Who Weren't Drafted Score Breakthrough, Make NFL Rosters", St. Louis Post-Dispatch, August 29, 1994.
Thomas, Jim, "Payton Hearing Footsteps, But They're a Long Way Off", St. Louis Post-Dispatch, August 1, 1993

1971 births
Living people
Allan Hancock Bulldogs football players
American football cornerbacks
Berlin Thunder players
Detroit Fury players
New Orleans Saints players
Players of American football from St. Louis
Scottish Claymores players
Tampa Bay Storm players
Tennessee Titans players
Utah State Aggies football players
Washington University Bears football coaches